Morningstar Commune (also known as Morning Star Ranch and The Digger Farm) was an active open land counterculture commune in rural Sonoma County, California near the towns of Occidental and Sebastopol.

History
Morningstar was part of the changing society of young adults in the 1960s that traveled back and forth between San Francisco's Haight-Ashbury district and Sebastopol. Co-founder Louis Gottlieb coined the acronym LATWIDNO (Land Access To Which Is Denied No One) to refer to the ranch and other similar communal-living experiments. They preached that "if you told no one to leave, the land (the vibes) selected the people who lived on it." The ranch existed in this form for a short time (1967-1972) but was a regular gathering-place for many of those traveling through the Haight. Sonoma County finally placed a permanent injunction forbidding anyone but Gottlieb's family from living there, and proceeded to bulldoze structures three times (at Gottlieb's expense). Gottlieb's fines for 'contempt of court' for not ordering people off the land finally totaled over $14,000. He also was jailed for a week on contempt charges. After all the turmoil, Morning Star ceased to exist by 1973.

"Morningstar" lives on as the name of one of the residences at Twin Oaks Community, a contemporary commune of 100 members in Virginia. All buildings at Twin Oaks are named after communities that no longer exist.  Ramon Sender has written about Morningstar as part of his effort to document the history of the Free Land movement by compiling oral history interviews. See "Home Free Home".

When the Limeliters folk trio (of which Gottlieb was a founding member) reunited in the 1970s, their autobiographical song "Acres of Limeliters" noted the activities of the members while they had been apart, including the line ". . .while Lou played Executive Hippie at his Morningstar groupie rest home!"

T.C. Boyle's 2003 novel Drop City tells the fictional account of a commune with many qualities in common with Morningstar.

In 2008, a play written about the Morningstar Commune premiered in California.

, the property is up for sale by Gottlieb's heirs, and friends of Morningstar are searching for someone in need of 
a substantial tax write-off to purchase and donate the property to  a local land trust.

References

External links
 Links to Morningstar Newsletter, Scrapbook of Morningstar Photos, and other material.

 Has an Index of Materials.

Culture in the San Francisco Bay Area
Hippie movement
History of Sonoma County, California
Intentional communities in California